Ilona Burgrová (born 15 March 1984) is a Czech professional basketball player. She plays for Czech Republic women's national basketball team. She competed at the 2012 Summer Olympics.

South Carolina statistics
Source

References

1984 births
Living people
Basketball players at the 2012 Summer Olympics
Centers (basketball)
Czech expatriate basketball people in France
Czech expatriate basketball people in the United States
Czech women's basketball players
Olympic basketball players of the Czech Republic
Sportspeople from Hradec Králové
South Carolina Gamecocks women's basketball players